This is a list of IBF world champions, showing every world champion certificated by the International Boxing Federation (IBF). The IBF is one of the four major governing bodies in professional boxing, and has certified world champions in 17 different weight classes since 1983.

Boxers who won the title but were stripped due to the title bout being overturned to a no contest are not listed.

Heavyweight

Cruiserweight

Light heavyweight

Super middleweight

Middleweight

Junior middleweight

Welterweight

Junior welterweight

Lightweight

Junior lightweight

Featherweight

Junior featherweight

Bantamweight

Junior bantamweight

Flyweight

Junior flyweight

Mini flyweight

See also
List of current world boxing champions
List of undisputed boxing champions
List of WBA world champions
List of WBC world champions
List of WBO world champions
List of The Ring world champions
List of IBF female world champions
List of IBO world champions

References

External links
Official list of current IBF champions

IBF

IBF